Bomet Central is a constituency in Kenya inhabited by the Kipsigis community. It is one of five constituencies in Bomet County.

Administrative and political units 
Bomet central is headed by member of parliament Hon Ronald Kiprotich Tonui and has five county assembly wards namely Silibwet, Singorwet, Ndarawetta, Chesoen and Mutarakwa.

Agriculture 
The main economic activity practiced in the area is farming, some of the crops grown include tea and maize.

See also 

 Sotik Constituency
 Chepalungu Constituency
 Konoin Constituency
 Bomet East Constituency

References 

Constituencies in Bomet County